Nahit Menteşe (born 1932) is a Turkish politician who served in various ministerial posts in the 1960s and 1970s, and again in the 1990s, including Minister of Interior 1993 to 1996. He was briefly Deputy Prime Minister of Turkey in 1996 under Mesut Yılmaz in the 53rd government of Turkey.

Career
Menteşe was elected to parliament in 1965, serving as Minister of Customs and Excise in 1968-1969. Re-elected in 1969, he served as Minister of Transport (1969–1970) and Energy (1970-1971). He was again Minister of Transport in 1975-1977. He was re-elected to parliament in 1977, and was Minister of National Education 1977-1978.  He became Secretary-General of the Justice Party prior to the 1980 Turkish coup d'état.

After some years absent from parliament he was re-elected in 1991 and 1995, becoming Minister of Interior (1993 - 1996) and briefly Deputy Prime Minister of Turkey in 1996.

References 

1932 births
Living people
People from Milas
Deputy Prime Ministers of Turkey
Susurluk scandal
Motherland Party (Turkey) politicians
Democrat Party (Turkey, current) politicians
Deputies of Aydın
Leaders of political parties in Turkey
Ministers of the Interior of Turkey
Ministers of National Education of Turkey
Ministers of Transport and Communications of Turkey
Ministers of Energy and Natural Resources of Turkey
Ministers of Customs and Trade of Turkey
Members of the 20th Parliament of Turkey
Members of the 32nd government of Turkey
Members of the 50th government of Turkey
Members of the 51st government of Turkey
Members of the 53rd government of Turkey
Istanbul University Faculty of Law alumni
Ministers of Tourism of Turkey